Minjur is a town located in the outskirts of  North Chennai, India. It is located in the Thiruvallur district in the Indian state of Tamil Nadu. Minjur is called 'Vada Kanchi' meaning North Kanchipuram. The town has two famous temples for Shiva and Vishnu, similar to Kanchipuram. The neighbourhood is served by Minjur railway station of the Chennai Suburban Railway Network.

Geography
It has an average elevation of 11 metres (36 feet). With Ponneri as its north, Cholavaram as its west, Manali New Town, Manali and Thiruvottiyur as its south, it is situated about 25 km from north of Chennai and well connected to that city with roadways and railways.

Minjur is a well-developed town which comprises more than 20 villages around it with most villages underdeveloped in terms of roads, schools, and other amenities. Minjur belongs to Ponneri taluk.

Demographics
 India census, Minjur had a population of 23,947. Males constitute 50% of the population and females 50%. Minjur has an average literacy rate of 77%, higher than the national average of 59.5%: male literacy is 84%, and female literacy is 71%. In Minjur, 10% of the population is under 6 years of age. Almost half the population dwells near and around Ponneri as almost all state government offices, magistrate, registrar office, and major banks are located at Ponneri. Minjur has a major vegetables market for people below the poverty line in the nearby villages. Minjur has also been a key residential area for many years for the Union Employees of Hinduja Group Companies located in Ennore and Tamil Nadu Electricity Board employees.

Temples

Kamatchi Ekambaranathar Koil - situated in centre part of Minjur town.
Lord Shiva Temple
Minjur Varadaraja Perumal
Devadhanam Ranganathar Perumal Koil (5 km from North of Minjur in a small village named Devadhanam) on the way to "Neithavoyal".
BalaMurugan Tample ("Vallalar sabai" - minjur to kattur road 3 km distance in Neithavoyal)
Sri Panjamuga Gayathri Temple (Minjur to Kattur road 3 km distance in Neithavoyal)
Arulmigu Muppathamman Temple - Grama Devadai.
Arulmigu Ayyappa Temple
Anchunayar Temple
Pachai Amman Temple
Kulakarai Vinagayar Temple
Thirumanangeeswarar Temple -Thiruvudai Amman Temple (Ichcha Shakti) - 2 km from Minjur
Ellaiamman Temple
Mangalambikai Amman Temple
Sai Baba Temple - In Padmavathy Nagar
Sri Venugopalswamy Bajanai Mandhir, Venkata Reddy Palayam
Sri Varasitthi Vinayagar Temple, Venkata Reddy Palayam
Sri Karumari Amman Temple, Lakshmipuram 1st colony
Thai Moogambigai Temple, Ramana Nagar, B. D. Office
Sri Nagamallieswarar Sornambigai Temple, Nallur village 
Sri Selva Vinagayar Temple, Nallur village
Sri Lakshmi Amman Temple, Nallur village
Sri Angala Amman Temple, Nallur village
Amudha Bala Abhirami Amman Temple, Balaji nagar
Sri Saelur Amman Temple, Nallur village
Semmavaram Jjalgandesawara Swamy Temple

Educational institutions
 Shree Chandra Prabhu Jain College

Growth 
Minjur is one of the suburban places of Chennai which is highly growing in terms of Education, Industrialization, and Agriculture, which are expanding by leaps and bounds. Minjur, in its land area, is twice the size of Thiruvottiyur and thrice that of Ponneri which is very much near to Minjur.

The Minjur seawater desalination plant, which supplies 100 million litres a day water to Chennai city, was inaugurated on July 31, 2010.

Outer Ring Road (ORR) which connects southern Chennai (Vandalur on NH 45) to Minjur is a main part of the CMDA's Second Master Plan for the greater Chennai.
Minjur can be reached using bus or train service.

References

Neighbourhoods in Chennai